Aberjhani (born Jeffery J. Lloyd July 8, 1957, in Savannah, Georgia) is an American historian, columnist, novelist, poet, artist, and editor. Although well known for his blog articles on literature and politics, he is perhaps best known as co-author of Encyclopedia of the Harlem Renaissance and author of The River of Winged Dreams. The encyclopedia won a Choice Academic Title Award in 2004.

Early life and education
Aberjhani grew up in Savannah, Georgia. Upon graduating from Savannah High School in 1975, he studied journalism, creative writing, and the American community at a variety of colleges: Savannah State College (now University); Eckerd College in St. Petersburg, Florida; Macalester College in St. Paul, Minnesota; Temple University in Philadelphia; and the New College of California in San Francisco. He completed additional studies in journalism at the Fort Benjamin Harrison School of Journalism in Indianapolis, Indiana.

Military service
He served a two-year tour of duty with the U.S. Air Force in Fairbanks, Alaska; four years in Suffolk, England; and another two years with the USAF Reserves in Charleston, South Carolina. He studied Equal Opportunity and Human Relations Counseling at the DEOMI Institute at Tyndall AFB, Florida.

Literary career
The author took the name Aberjhani as an adult: he says that it came to him in a dream. He continued writing while in the Air Force. He later served from 1994 until 2001 as co-editor of the Savannah Literary Journal. During the same period, he served as a literary reviewer for the Georgia Council for the Arts and held various position with the Poetry Society of Georgia, the oldest such literary organization in the state, and became well known as both a spoken word poet and published author. His national debut came in 1997 with ESSENCE Magazine's publication of his cover story/essay "This Mother’s Son." The magazine at the time commanded a circulation of 7 million readers.  From 1999 to 2005 his poems appeared regularly in ESSENCE, making him one of the most well-known poets in the United States.

Literary influences
Aberjhani has said in interviews that he has been influenced more by literary movements than by individual writers. He co-edited an encyclopedia on the Harlem Renaissance, a major 20th-century movement. But others have included Modernism in general, Surrealism, the Beats, the Black Arts Movement, Postmodernism, and Existentialism. He has also gone on record as being influenced at different periods by the following authors: James Baldwin, Albert Camus, W.E.B. Du Bois, Henry Dumas, Ralph Ellison, William Faulkner, Khalil Gibran, Langston Hughes, Zora Neale Hurston, Federico Garcia Lorca, Dambudzo Marechera, Henry Miller, James Alan McPherson, with whom he shares the same hometown and was featured in the Literary Savannah anthology, Toni Morrison, Anais Nin, Jalal al-Din Rumi, Jean-Paul Sartre, Alice Walker, and Margaret Walker.

Works as visual artist
The writer made his debut as a visual artist with a photographic documentation of the impact of Hurricane Matthew on the Historic District of Savannah in 2016. The series included a black and white image originally titled "Eugene Talmadge Memorial Bridge the Morning After Hurricane Matthew No. 2" and which was used to help promote efforts to change the bridge's name Savannah Tribune, "Renaming The Talmadge Bridge: A Free Public Discussion Moderated By The Honorable Dr. Otis S. Johnson" (Aug 16, 2017). In 2018 he created the compositional art technique and subsequent body of work named after it called "Silk-Featherbrush Artstyle." His art is featured extensively in the book Dreams of the Immortal City Savannahand on the cover of Greeting Flannery O'Connor at the Back Door of My Mind.

Awards and honors
2006, Aberjhani won a Readers Poll: Savannah Poet and Spoken Word Artist of the Year Award, conducted by Connect Savannah.
2007, Accepted as member of The Academy of American Poets
2009, he was inducted into the Red Room Hall of Fame; Red Room is an online writers community and marketing site based in San Francisco.
In 2011 he received a "Michael Jackson Tribute Portrait", or VIP DOT by the artist David Ilan.
2011,Listed as one of "The New Black" published in Best American Poetry, Diann Blakely author, June 13 online edition. 
2012, Became a member of PEN American Center, an affiliate of the worldwide PEN International organization.
2014, Received and accepted invitation from LinkedIn administrators to join its selection of members and "influencers" publishing on the website.
2019, Poem “Suzannian Algorithm Finger-Painted on an Abstract Wall” published in 5-Decade Retrospective Catalog commemorating the life and career of Suzanne Jackson (artist) and in conjunction with exhibition at Telfair Museums Jepson Center for the Arts.

Humanitarian causes
Aberjhani founded the online Creative Thinkers International community in September 2007 to support creative nonviolent conflict resolutions in the face of escalating warfare and terrorism following 9/11. Consisting of more than 500 independent artists from around the globe, the community maintains forums on such issues as Human Liberties Around the World and the potential role of the cultural arts in helping to maintain international peace. In March 2013 he announced his support for the September 2013 Global March for Peace and Unity Event. In January 2014 he signed the international Charter for Compassion. He later as a member contributed articles on Boko Haram, guerrilla contextualization, and social media ethics to the nonprofit organization's Voices Compassion Education Project. In 2016 he joined the Span the Gap Movement advocating that the name of the Eugene Talmadge Memorial Bridge be changed to one less racially inflammatory. The author first addressed the issue the 2007 memoir The American Poet Who Went Home Again.

Bibliography

History and memoir
Encyclopedia of the Harlem Renaissance (nonfiction; 2003 and 2010, with Sandra L. West and Clement Alexander Price, Facts on File/Infobase Publishing) 
The Wisdom of W.E.B. Du Bois (biography, quotations; 2003 and 2010, Kensington Books and Open Road Media Philosophical Library Series) 
The American Poet Who Went Home Again (memoir; 2007, Black Skylark Singing) 
Journey through the Power of the Rainbow: Quotations from a Life Made Out of Poetry (literary reference, quotations; 2014, Black Skylark Singing)  and 
Dreams of the Immortal City Savannah (memoir/history; 2019, Cyberwit.net Publishing) 
Greeting Flannery O'Connor at the Back Door of My Mind: Adventures and Misadventures in Literary Savannah (literary criticism/memoir; 2020, Black Skylark Singing with Lulu Press)

Novel
Christmas When Music Almost Killed the World (novel; 2007, Black Skylark Singing) 
Songs from the Black Skylark zPed Music Player (reissue; 2019, Amazon Kindle Direct Publishing)

Short fiction and poetry collections
He has self-published works about childhood experiences in Savannah in both prose and poetry as well as being published by different small and university presses.

I Made My Boy Out of Poetry (short fiction and poetry; 1997/2003, Washington Publications/ iUniverse Publishing) 
Visions of a Skylark Dressed in Black (poetry; 2006, BSE-Publishing) (short stories and poetry; 2012, 1st U.S. Edition, Black Skylark Singing) 
The Bridge of Silver Wings (poetry; 2007, Black Skylark Singing) 
Elemental the Power of Illuminated Love featuring paintngs by Luther E. Vann (art and poetry; 2008, Telfair Museum of Art and Soar Pub) 
The River of Winged Dreams (poetry; 2010, Bright Skylark Literary Productions)

Online columnist
The Digital Clarity Group's Examiner.com, under the umbrella of the Anschutz Company and AXS Entertainment, hosted Aberjhani's National African-American Art Examiner column from July 2009 until June 2016. His topics have included fine art and artists’ biographies, as well as reports on contemporary politics, social network trends, and popular culture. He is noted for a series of articles on the life and death of Michael Jackson, the controversial case of Georgia death-row prisoner Troy Anthony Davis, the presidency of Barack Obama, and the United Nation's 2011 International Year for People of African Descent. His Notebook on Black History Month 2012 series covered historical and contemporary subjects including included Whitney Houston, Angela Davis, and Harry Belafonte.

Articles and essays
 Authors Lee Harper’s and Toni Morrison’s New Books Likely to Influence Millennials’ Dialogues on Race, Bright Skylark Literary Essay, Feb 2015
 A Writer's Journey to Selma Alabama, LinkedIn Pulse Essay, Jan 2015
Let's Fix It: 7 Steps to Help Replace Legislated Fear with Informed Compassion, LinkedIn Law & Government Feature, Oct 2014
 Text and Meaning in Michael Jackson's Xscape (album) AXS Entertainment, 5-part Series, June 2014
 Gifts of the Poets: Eugene B. Redmond and Coleman Barks, Networked Articles, April 2014. 
 Text and Meaning in Martin Luther King Jr.'s I Have a Dream Speech, Red Room Networked Articles, August 6, 2013.
 World-class Musicians Honor Turkey’s Long Relationship with Jazz Red Room Networked Articles, May 1, 2013.
 This Is Why Hip-hop Icons Like LL Cool J Tweet Positive Quotes Creative Spirit of the Harlem Renaissance, March 19, 2013.
 47 Percenters and Guerrilla Decontextualization: Dreams and Nightmares Red Room blog article, Oct 1, 2012
 Guerrilla Decontextualization and the 2012 Presidential Election Campaign, Red Room Authors & PEN American Center, July 30, 2012
 Poetics of Paradigm Dancing in the 2012 Presidential Election Campaign, PEN American Center, June 6, 2012
 "Trayvon Martin, Robert Lee, and Millions of Tears Fallen", editorial on the killing of Trayvon Martin
 Notebook on Black History Month 2012 (Part 6): The Consecrated Soul of Whitney Houston (editorial with poem) Feb 17, 2012.
 Notebook on Black History Month 2012 (Part 4): The Black Power Mixtape 1967-1975, Author Blog, Feb 15, 2012.
Savannah Talks Troy Anthony Davis Article Series, Red Room Author Blog, July 2009 – 2011.
"Looking at the World through Michael Jackson's Left Eye" Michael Jackson Tribute Portrait, Aug 29, 2011
"President Barack Obama and the Message Beyond the Photograph," Examiner, May 20, 2011
"What Death of Osama bin Laden Indicates about Barack Obama’s Leadership," Examiner, May 2, 2011.
"Black History Month: What Would Du Bois Do Today?" AOL Black Voices, Feb 23, 2011.
"As Egypt Howls and History Tweets," Examiner, Jan 29, 2011.
"Black History Month Enhanced by 2011 International Year for People of African Descent," Examiner, Jan 25, 2011.
"Haiti and Humanity’s Fierce Urgency of Now," Examiner, Jan 22, 2010.
"Work and Soul in Michael Jackson's This Is It," Examiner, Nov 14, 2009.
"The Harlem Renaissance Way Down South," Amazon Short, May 2007.
"How to Spitfire in the South, THE SOUTH Magazine," August 2006.
"A Legacy Less Traveled, Dr. Deborah Mack Shines a Light on Early African-American History in Savannah," CONNECT SAVANNAH News Magazine, May 10, 2006.
"Not Fading Away," on WWII Veteran John Morrison, CONNECT SAVANNAH News Magazine, Feb 8, 2006.
"Woman to Woman," CONNECT SAVANNAH News Magazine, Oct 12, 2005.
"The Keepers of Their People's Spirit," REDBRIDGE Review Journal, Oct 10, 2005.
"The Artist Known as Pleasant," CONNECT SAVANNAH News Magazine, Aug 17, 2005.
"This Mother’s Son," ESSENCE Magazine cover story, Nov 1997.

Selected titles as editor
 Savannah Literary Journal (1994-2001, Savannah Writers Workshop) ISSN 1070-6194
 What Leaders Believe (Polk and White; 2010, Mountain State Univ Press) 
 Savannah, Immortal City, Vol. 1 Civil War Savannah Series (Sheehy, Wallace, and Goode-Walker; 2011, Emerald Book Co.) 
 Savannah: Brokers, Bankers, and Bay Lane, Vol. 2 Civil War Savannah Series (Sheehy, Wallace, and Goode-Walker; 2012, Emerald Book Co.)

Notable Anthology Inclusions
Discover Savannah CD-ROM (digital travel guide edited by Angela Lain and Laura Lawton, Crisfield Multimedia, 1996).
Literary Savannah (travel anthology edited by Patrick Allen, Trinity University Press; August 2011) 
Black Gold: An Anthology of Black Poetry (edited by Ja A. Jahannes, Turner Mayfield Publishing, 2014)

See also
Poetry Life and Times

Notes

References
 Allen, Patrick (2011). Literary Savannah. Trinity University Press. July. . p. 277-279, p. 281.
 Scott, Dee (2010). "Interview with Aberjhani." Authors on the Rise, February.
 Staff. "Savannah Author Inducted Into Red Room Hall of Fame", The Savannah Tribune, 4 November 2009, p. 3.
 Nhojj (2008). "Singer Nhojj Interviews Aberjhani." MySpace Entertainment Profile. 13 October 2008.
Harris, Marlive (2008). "Grits.com Interview with Aberjhani and Luther E. Vann," Grits.com, September 2008.	
 Sickler, Linda (2008)."ELEMENTAL, At Last" review of ELEMENTAL, The Power of Illuminated Love.CONNECT SAVANNAH, 4 June cover story.
 Weickgenant, Joel (2008). "Words and Paint," Savannah News Press, 12 Jan. Arts Magazine cover story.
 Barfield, Randall (2007). "Interview with Aberjhani." POETRY LIFE AND TIMES eZine, July.
 Gusby, Kim (2003). "Interview with Aberjhani." Coastal Morning Sunrise'' on WTOC, Savannah, GA. October 2003.

External links

Official Author Website
Aberjhani's Official Postered Chromatic Poetics Art
World Catalogue Identities
Poetry Life and Times An Interview with Author-Poet Aberjhani
LibraryThing Author
Open Library Bio
Creative Thinkers International
Aberjhani at American Pen Center

21st-century American poets
21st-century American novelists
21st-century American historians
21st-century American male writers
African-American novelists
Living people
Writers from Savannah, Georgia
American book editors
21st-century American memoirists
American columnists
American male bloggers
American bloggers
American male journalists
Journalists from Georgia (U.S. state)
American political writers
American literary critics
American male poets
American male novelists
Poets from Georgia (U.S. state)
American male essayists
1957 births
American male short story writers
Literary theorists
Mythopoeic writers
21st-century American short story writers
21st-century American essayists
Novelists from Georgia (U.S. state)
American photographers
African-American poets
American male non-fiction writers